Télérama is a weekly French cultural and television magazine published in Paris, France. The name is a contraction of its earlier title: Télévision-Radio-Cinéma. Fabienne Pascaud is currently managing editor. Ludovic Desautez is deputy editor for digital. Valérie Hurier is deputy editor for print.

History and profile
Télérama was established in 1947. Its founder was the Christian journalist Georges Montaron. The magazine had been published by Hachette Filipacchi until 2001 when it began to be published by Quebecor World Inc.

The magazine has been owned by La Vie-Le Monde since 2003. It is published on a weekly basis on Wednesdays by Publications de la Vie Catholique. The magazine had a Christianity-oriented political stance.

The headquarters of Télérama is in Paris. Its primary contents are television and radio listings, though the magazine also prints film, theatre, music and book reviews, as well as cover stories and feature articles of cultural interest. The magazine owns a radio station. Stéphane Charbonnier was among the former contributors of the magazine.

Circulation
The 1990 circulation of Télérama was 515,000 copies. It was one of fifty best-selling television magazines worldwide with a circulation of 664,000 copies in 2001. The magazine sold 649,000 copies in 2005. Its circulation was 650,000 copies in 2007.

In 2010 Télérama had a circulation of 633,559 copies. Its circulation was 578,680 copies in 2014.

References

External links
 Official Website (in French)

1947 establishments in France
Cultural magazines
French-language magazines
Listings magazines
Magazines established in 1947
Magazines published in Paris
Television magazines
Weekly magazines published in France